The Daemyung Killer Whales were a professional ice hockey team based in Seoul, South Korea. The club joined the Asia League Ice Hockey in the 2016–17 season.

Honours
Korea National Ice Hockey Championship
Winners (2): 2017, 2019

Season-by-season record

Asia League

References 

Ice hockey teams in South Korea
Asia League Ice Hockey teams
Ice hockey clubs established in 2016
Ice hockey clubs disestablished in 2021
2016 establishments in South Korea
2021 disestablishments in South Korea
Sport in Seoul